Nicholas, Lord Ramage is a fictional character, the protagonist of a series of sea novels written by Dudley Pope. Ramage was an officer in the Royal Navy during the Napoleonic Wars.  He is a contemporary of Horatio Hornblower, but unlike the latter, who never fought in a large fleet battle, Ramage participated in both the Battle of Cape St. Vincent and the Battle of Trafalgar.

Early life
This section contains information on Ramage's life before the commencement of the Lord Ramage Novels. For information after this period, see the respective summaries of the books.
Nicholas Ramage was born in 1775 at Blazey Hall in Cornwall, the eldest son of the Earl of Blazey. Nicholas' father was a Vice-Admiral who was court martialled (some sympathetic colleagues felt unjustly so) and Nicholas is burdened by this legacy. Ramage's mother was fond of traveling and took Ramage to Tuscany to live in 1777, when his father departed to assume naval command in North America. They returned to England for his father's court martial in 1782 and because of the notoriety surrounding his father's court martial returned to Tuscany in 1783 where Ramage remained until he joined the navy in 1788 at age 13.  Despite his father's disgrace, Ramage retained significant patrons within the navy enabling him to be promoted to lieutenant at age 20, the earliest age possible.

Commands

Novels Featured in
Ramage (1965)
Ramage and the Drumbeat (a.k.a. Drumbeat) (1968)
Ramage and the Freebooters (a.k.a. The Triton Brig) (1969)
Governor Ramage R.N. (1973)
Ramage's Prize (1974)
Ramage and the Guillotine (1975)
Ramage's Diamond (1976) HMS Diamond Rock
Ramage's Mutiny (1977)
Ramage and the Rebels (1978)
The Ramage Touch (1979)
Ramage's Signal (1980)
Ramage and the Renegades (1981)
Ramage's Devil (1982)
Ramage's Trial (1984)
Ramage's Challenge (1985)
Ramage at Trafalgar (1986)
Ramage and the Saracens (1988)
Ramage and the Dido (1989)

References

See also

Jack Aubrey
Horatio Hornblower
The Bolitho novels

Novel series
Literary characters introduced in 1965
Characters in British novels of the 20th century
Fictional sailors
Fictional military captains
Historical novels
Novels set during the Napoleonic Wars
Novels by Dudley Pope